Hilbert Branch is a stream in Lewis County in the U.S. state of Missouri.

Hilbert Branch was named for the fact a share of the first settlers in the area had the surname Hilbert.

See also
List of rivers of Missouri

References

Rivers of Lewis County, Missouri
Rivers of Missouri